Chew Fu is a New York-based electronic record producer, remixer and DJ, born in the Netherlands.

He is best known for his official remixes for pop artists including Lady Gaga, Rihanna, Timbaland, Mariah Carey, Far East Movement and Robyn and his distinctive style of production which features a fusion of electro house and hip hop music.

Instead of using the term remix, Chew Fu coined the term "refix"  because he says that his "remixes are like a completely new productions." When DJing Chew Fu only plays his own original productions and remixes.

On where his name came from, "My crew came up with it when I was producing tracks for Bad Boy Records to describe my production process and style. Chew Fu is the sound made during and after I’ve consumed a track and spit out a hot refix."

Early life
Kardolus grew up in Almere, Netherlands. He graduated with honors from the saxophone at the Utrecht Conservatory with Piet Noordijk. He is a classically trained jazz musician who holds a master's degree in Music.

Career
In the 1990s, he performed with Eboman and he played in Sound of Impact and worked in the 1990s as DJ Mac Attack and made two EPs under that name. He played in The Mindminders He then played with the band include at Lowlands, Pinkpop, Dynamo Open Air and the Drum Rhythm Festival. Published in 2000 album Breathe of Life by Ellen Helmus was produced by Kardolus and then he played saxophone and keyboards. With Helmus and The Mindminders he played in 2001 at the North Sea Jazz Festival.

He moved to Brooklyn in 2001 to get a start in music. He spread his music for free on weblogs. Chew Fu got his start in the industry working for Diddy and Quincy Jones's record label Qwest. as well as utilizing a worldwide network of dance music bloggers.

Chew Fu began "producing hip hop with house music back in 2005, because he wanted to play it in the clubs but no-one was making it." He switched to house music until it caught on in 2010 when he began to produce remixes for Lady Gaga, Timbaland, and Rihanna.

As a producer, Chew Fu has created original productions with Wiley, Beanie Man, Donna Summer, Kerli and Doug E Fresh, to be included on his debut album slated for release in July 2011.

In 2012 produced original songs for Breedlove, Perry Mystique, Steve Clisby, A-Clay, J-cast.

Discography

Albums 
Rated R: Remixed (2010) 
Chew Fu and... [Volume 1] (2011) 
Chew Hefner Affair (2011)
Magic Monday (2015)

Extended plays 
Get it On (2000) 
Music Makes Me (2001) 
The Rhythm in You/Suntan Lotion (2001) 
Without You (2002) 
Rise Up (2003) 
U Can Make it (2003) 
Why Can`t we Change (2005) 
*Stand By Me (2006) 
Move for Me (2007) 
At The Club (2008) 
Shake Your Thang (2008) 
Take That (2010) 
The Magic Monday (2014)
Purple Rain (2015)

Singles 
"Without You" (2002)
"Stand By Me" (2006)
"Shake Your Thang" (2008)
"Lovegame (Chew Fu Ghettohouse fix)" (2009)
"Take That" (2010)
"I Never Had" (2011)
"Sex O'Clock" (2015)

Remixes

References

1973 births
Living people
21st-century male musicians
21st-century saxophonists
American record producers
DJs from Amsterdam
Dutch expatriates in the United States
Dutch jazz saxophonists
Dutch record producers
Male jazz musicians
Male saxophonists
Musicians from Flevoland
People from Almere